This is a list of diplomatic missions of Saudi Arabia. Ibn Saud established the General Directory for the Foreign Affairs in 1926. Four years later it was given ministry status, even though it had a staff of fifteen employees in total and no diplomatic missions abroad. In 1936, Saudi Arabia had five missions–in London, Baghdad, Damascus, Geneva, and Cairo–and fifteen years later this number jumped to sixteen. Saudi Arabia now has an extensive diplomatic presence worldwide.

Africa 

 Algiers (Embassy)

 Ouagadougou (Embassy)

 Yaoundé (Embassy)

 N'Djamena (Embassy)

 Moroni (Embassy)

 Djibouti (Embassy)

 Cairo (Embassy)
 Alexandria (Consulate-General)
 Suez (Consulate-General)

 Asmara (Embassy)

 Addis Ababa (Embassy)

 Libreville (Embassy)

 Accra (Embassy)

 Conakry (Embassy)

 Abidjan (Embassy)

 Nairobi (Embassy)

 Tripoli (Embassy)

 Bamako (Embassy)

 Nouakchott (Embassy)

 Rabat (Embassy)

 Maputo (Embassy)

 Niamey (Embassy)

 Abuja (Embassy)
 Kano (Consulate-General)

 Dakar (Embassy)

 Mogadishu (Embassy)

 Pretoria (Embassy)

 Khartoum (Embassy)

 Dar es Salaam (Embassy)

 Tunis (Embassy)

 Kampala (Embassy)

 Lusaka (Embassy)

Americas 

 Buenos Aires (Embassy)

 Brasília (Embassy)

 Ottawa (Embassy)

 Santiago (Embassy)

 Havana (Embassy)

 Mexico City (Embassy)

 Lima (Embassy)

 Washington, D.C. (Embassy)
 Houston (Consulate-General)
 Los Angeles (Consulate-General)
 New York (Consulate-General)

 Montevideo (Embassy)

 Caracas (Embassy)

Asia

 Kabul (Embassy)

 Baku (Embassy)

 Manama (Embassy)

 Dhaka (Embassy)

 Bandar Seri Begawan (Embassy)

 Beijing (Embassy)
 Hong Kong (Consulate)
 Guangzhou (Consulate)

 Tbilisi (Embassy)

 New Delhi (Embassy)
 Mumbai (Consulate-General)

 Jakarta (Embassy)

Baghdad (Embassy)
 Basra (Consulate General)
 Erbil (Consulate General)

 Tokyo (Embassy)
 Osaka (Consulate-General)

 Amman (Embassy)

 Astana (Embassy)

 Kuwait City (Embassy)

 Bishkek (Embassy)

 Beirut (Embassy)

 Kuala Lumpur (Embassy)

 Malé (Embassy)

 Yangon (Embassy)

 Kathmandu (Embassy)

 Muscat (Embassy)

 Islamabad (Embassy)
 Karachi (Consulate-General)

 Manila (Embassy)

 Doha (Embassy)

 Singapore (Embassy)

 Seoul (Embassy)

 Colombo (Embassy)

 Taipei (Saudi Arabian Trade Office in Taipei)

 Dushanbe (Embassy)

 Bangkok (Embassy)

 Ankara (Embassy)
 Istanbul (Consulate-General)

 Ashgabat (Embassy)

 Abu Dhabi (Embassy)
 Dubai (Consulate-General)

 Tashkent (Embassy)

 Hanoi (Embassy)

 Sana'a (Embassy)
 Aden (Consulate)

Europe 

 Tirana (Embassy)

 Vienna (Embassy)

 Brussels (Embassy)

 Sarajevo (Embassy)

 Sofia (Embassy)

 Nicosia (Embassy)

 Prague (Embassy)

 Copenhagen (Embassy)

 Helsinki (Embassy)

 Paris (Embassy)

 Berlin (Embassy)

 Athens (Embassy)

 Budapest (Embassy)

 Dublin (Embassy)

 Rome (Embassy)

 The Hague (Embassy)

 Oslo (Embassy)

 Warsaw (Embassy)

 Lisbon (Embassy)

 Bucharest (Embassy)

 Moscow (Embassy)

 Madrid (Embassy)
 Málaga (Consulate)

 Stockholm (Embassy)

 Bern (Embassy)
 Geneva (Consulate)

 Kyiv (Embassy)

 London (Embassy)

Oceania

 Canberra (Embassy)
 Sydney (Consulate-General)

 Wellington (Embassy)
 Auckland (Consulate-General)

Multilateral organizations

Brussels (Mission to the European Union)

 Geneva (Permanent Delegation to the United Nations and other international organizations)
 New York (Permanent Mission to the United Nations)

 Paris (Permanent Mission to UNESCO)
 Arab League
 Cairo (Mission to the Arab League)
 OPEC
 Vienna (Mission to OPEC)

Gallery

Non-resident embassies

  (Madrid)
  (Lusaka)
  (Caracas)
  (Tbilisi)
  (Havana)
  (Caracas)
  (Moscow)
  (Mexico City)
  (Abuja)
  (New Delhi)
  (Brasilia)
  (Pretoria)
  (Abuja)
  (Dar es Salaam)
  (Dakar)
  (Hanoi)
  (N'Djamena)
  (Dakar)
  (Lima)
  (Dar es Salaam)
  (Wellington)
  (Lima)
  (Libreville)
  (Caracas)
  (Havana)
  (Brasilia)
  (Mexico City)
  (Libreville)
  (Helsinki)
  (Pretoria)
  (Canberra)
  (Dakar)
  (Caracas)
  (Mexico City)
  (Brasilia) 
  (Dakar)
  (Havana)
  (Mexico City)
  (Stockholm)
  (Havana)
  (Tirana)
  (Canberra)
  (New Delhi)
  (Stockholm)
  (Pretoria)
  (Abidjan)
  (Copenhagen)
  (Nairobi)
  (Pretoria)
  (Dar es Salaam) 
  (Paris)
  (Beijing)
  (Canberra)
  (Lusaka)
  (Mexico City)
  (Tirana)
  (Wellington)
  (Amman)
  (Canberra)
  (Lima)
  (Buenos Aires)
  (Kampala)
  (Rome)
  (Wellington)
  (Budapest)
  (Canberra)
  (Libreville)
  (Caracas)
  (Caracas)
  (Nairobi) 
  (Conakry)
  (Vienna)
  (Budapest)
  (Kinshasa)
  (Amman)
  (Brasilia)
  (Accra)
  (Wellington)
  (Caracas)
  (Wellington)
  (Jakarta)
  (Canberra)
  (Lusaka)

To open

Belgrade

 Najaf (Consulate General)

See also 

List of diplomatic missions in Saudi Arabia
Foreign relations of Saudi Arabia

References

External links 
 Ministry of Foreign Affairs of Kingdom of Saudi Arabia
 Ministry of Foreign Affairs of Kingdom of Saudi Arabia

Saudi
Diplomatic missions
Diplomatic missions of Saudi Arabia